Connecticut's 33rd State Senate district elects one member of the Connecticut State Senate. It consists of the towns of Chester, Clinton, Colchester, Deep River, East Haddam, East Hampton, Essex, Haddam, Lyme, Old Saybrook (part), Portland, Westbrook. It is currently represented by Democrat Norman Needleman.

Recent elections

2022

2020

2018

2016

2014

2012

References

33